A wild pig may be:

Suina, a suborder of even-toed mammals, including: 
Suidae, a family of animals that are pigs or pig-like, including the Suinae and more distantly related extinct Old World tribes
Suinae, a subfamily which includes the Sus genus, all other existing pig genera, and closely related extinct genera
Sus (genus), a genus including domestic pig, wild boar, and many Southeast Asian wild pig species
Eurasian wild boar, Sus scrofa
Wild pigs of the Philippines, any of four species of the genus Sus in the Philippines
Feral pigs, domesticated pigs, Sus scrofa domestica, that have reverted to life as wild animals
Tayassuidae, another family of animals that are pigs or pig-like: the New World pigs or peccaries/javelinas

Animal common name disambiguation pages